The Korfbal League & Hoofdklasse promotion/relegation play-off has been organized every year since the founding in 2005 of the Korfbal League. In the match the number 9 of the Korfbal League meets the loser of the Hoofdklasse promotion final. The winner gains a spot in next seasons Korfbal League.

Play-off Winners and Losers

References

2005 establishments in the Netherlands
Sports leagues in the Netherlands
Sports leagues established in 2005